Christian August of Holstein-Gottorp-Eutin (11 January 167324 April 1726) was a cadet of the reigning ducal House of Holstein-Gottorp who became prince of Eutin, prince-bishop of Lübeck and regent of the Duchy of Holstein-Gottorp.

He was the father of Adolf Frederick, King of Sweden, and the maternal grandfather of Catherine the Great, Empress of Russia.

Biography
He was a younger son of Christian Albert, Duke of Holstein-Gottorp and Princess Frederica Amalia of Denmark, daughter of King Frederick III of Denmark. His elder brother, Frederick IV, succeeded their father as ruler of the duchy, Christian August being given the small fiefdom of Eutin in 1695, whereupon he took the title Duke of Holstein-Eutin. Additionally, he was appointed coadjutor of Lübeck, a Lutheran Imperial state within the Holy Roman Empire, in 1701, and his family managed to have him elected as the bishop on 26 April 1706.

His eldest brother died in 1702, leaving only an underage son, Charles Frederick, Duke of Holstein-Gottorp, as his heir. From 1702 to 1708 Christian August was co-regent with his widowed sister-in-law, Hedvig Sophia of Sweden, for Charles Frederick, having been first installed as administrator under her authority. Upon her death in 1708, Christian August became sole regent of Holstein-Gottorp, which duchy was severely ravaged by the violence of the Great Northern War.

Marriage and issue
Christian August married his cousin Margravine Albertina Frederica of Baden-Durlach (3 July 1682 – 26 December 1755), on 2 September 1704, with whom he had ten children:

Hedwig Sophie Auguste of Holstein-Gottorp (9 October 1705 – 4 October 1764), Abbess of Herford, 1750–1764
Charles Augustus of Holstein-Gottorp (26 November 1706 – 31 May 1727), engaged to marry the future Elizabeth of Russia, but died before the wedding
Frederica Amalia of Holstein-Gottorp (12 January 1708 – 19 January 1782), a nun at Quedlinburg
Anne of Holstein-Gottorp (3 February 1709 – 2 February 1758), wed Prince Wilhelm of Saxe-Gotha-Altenburg (1701-1771), no issue. He was a brother of Augusta of Saxe-Gotha, mother of George III of Great Britain
Adolf Frederick of Holstein-Gottorp, King of Sweden (14 May 1710 – 12 April 1771). He was named crown prince of Sweden in 1743 and ascended the throne in 1751 as Adolf Frederick, King of Sweden.
Frederick August of Holstein-Gottorp, Duke of Oldenburg (20 September 1711 – 6 July 1785). He was initially bishop of Lübeck, and after his brother moved to Sweden, he inherited Eutin as well. In 1773, as part of a family agreement involving Denmark, Russia and Holstein-Gottorp, he also received a new duchy, Oldenburg, consisting of the counties of Oldenburg and Delmenhorst.
Johanna Elisabeth (24 October 1712 – 30 May 1760), wed Christian August, Prince of Anhalt-Zerbst, and became the mother of Catherine the Great, Empress of Russia.
William Christian of Holstein-Gottorp (20 September 1716 – 26 June 1719), died in infancy
Frederick Conrad of Holstein-Gottorp (12 March 1718 – 1719), died in infancy
Georg Ludwig of Holstein-Gottorp (16 March 1719 – 7 September 1763). His son Peter inherited the Duchy of Oldenburg from his childless cousin, the son of Frederick August

Christian August was succeeded by his eldest son Charles Augustus, who died before taking up the office, and then by his second son, Adolf Frederick.

Ancestry

Notes and references

Christian Augustus
Christian Augustus
Christian Augustus
Christian Augustus
Sons of monarchs